The 1955 Omloop Het Volk was the 11th edition of the Omloop Het Volk cycle race and was held on 6 March 1955. The race started and finished in Ghent. The race was won by Lode Anthonis.

General classification

References

1955
Omloop Het Nieuwsblad
Omloop Het Nieuwsblad